Give or Take is the debut studio album by American singer-songwriter Giveon, released June 24, 2022, via Epic Records and Not So Fast. The album includes production from Cardo Got Wings, Boi-1da, Sevn Thomas, Jahaan Sweet, Rogét Chahayed, Don Mills, and Giveon himself, among others.

Background 
Give or Take, which serves as the follow-up to Giveon's extended plays Take Time (2020) and When It's All Said and Done (2020), is Giveon's first full-length project, released after two years in the making. The album explores themes such as fame, love, and heartbreak. The album is structured in the form of a series of discussions between Giveon and his mother, with dialogue interspersed between some of the album's tracks. "The album concept is just me having a conversation with my mom", Giveon explained in an interview. "I am finally expressing to her everything I've been through for the last 18 to 24 months. As if I'm reading right out of a diary, I told her that I want to have a conversation. I just wanted it to be her and myself", he gave as the reason as to why he chose to omit guest features from the album.

Singles and music videos 
The album was preceded by the singles "For Tonight" and "Lie Again", released September 24, 2021, and April 29, 2022, respectively, and with accompanying music videos released the same days. Third single "Lost Me" was released the same day as the album along with a music video.

Style and reception 
{{Album ratings
| title = Give or Take ratings
| MC = 72/100
| rev1 = AllMusic
| rev1score = 
| rev2 = The Line of Best Fit
| rev2score = 8/10
| rev3 = Pitchfork
| rev3score = 6.0/10
}}
 The Line of Best Fits Josh Herring wrote that "the soothing nature of production is well complemented by beautiful baritone and reminiscent of an earlier form of R&B and soul music, one that is absent of traces of pop that riddles the genre contemporarily" and that "If you're looking for an authentic, soulful experience, then this is the album for you." The singles "For Tonight" and "Lie Again" are "stealing the show" and it "feels the album was geared to build up towards the higher-flying vocals of the lead singles and wind down into the latter half of the album" with an impressive vocal range on display. The album's "sonic range" is "limited", but "can still be a captivating experience – meaning, it doesn't necessarily have 'bangers', though that isn't to say this isn't a valuable listening experience."Pitchforks DeAsia Paige wrote that the album faced a similar issue to Giveon's 2020 cover of D'Angelo's consummate "Untitled (How Does It Feel)" which "has all the spiritual vigor of a partner who sends you a lengthy good morning text every day; it's just not that stimulating." The album's "expansive ballads seek to scale the highs and lows of love and heartbreak" but "Giveon more often sounds like he's cruising on autopilot in the center lane." Giveon "cautioned fans to keep a box of tissues nearby" in case they cried during their listening experience, but this is "not necessary". The album "paints a very familiar story of a hopeless romantic who's searching to understand their flaws and solve their relationship woes in the throes of newfound fame", but there's "no shortage of this narrative in contemporary R&B". Compared to rum.gold's Thicker Than Water and Lucky Daye's Painted, on which "the challenge of being a self-aware lover is illuminated with a lush variety of soul-baring vocal arrangements that would make love's most dedicated critics become open to understanding the possibilities of healthy romance", "Giveon's narrative doesn't land." Paige closes by noting that Take Time-era Giveon "experimented with melody and challenged himself vocally" while on Give or Take'' he "stunts that growth in favor of secluding himself in his comfort zone."

Year-end lists

Track listing

Personnel 
 Giveon – vocals
 Brian Cruz – recording engineer
 Rodrigo Barahona – recording engineer (1, 2, 10-12)
 Andrew Schwartz – recording engineer (4)
 Sam Valentine Zuckerman – recording engineer (5, 6, 8)
 Robert N. Johnson – assistant engineer (1, 2, 4, 5, 8, 11, 12)
 Syd Tagle – assistant engineer (3, 7, 13, 14)
 Ian Rene – assistant engineer (6, 10)
 Jonathan Lopez Garcia – assistant engineer (6, 9)
 Brodie Means – assistant engineer (10)
 Josh Seller – assistant engineer (12)
 John Kercy – mixing engineer
 Colin Leonard – mastering engineer (1-5, 7-15)
 Leon Thomas – miscellaneous production (1, 2, 5, 8-11)
 Nils – miscellaneous production (2, 5, 10, 11), programming (5, 10)
 Peter Lee Johnson – miscellaneous production (9), programming (2, 4, 5, 12)
 Trisha Cruzada – programming (5, 14)
 Ayanna – programming (12)
 Syd – programming (12)
 Victor – programming (12)

Charts

Weekly charts

Year-end charts

Release history

References 

2022 debut albums
Giveon albums
Epic Records albums
Contemporary R&B albums by American artists
Soul albums by American artists